Zymna Voda rural hromada is a hromada (municipality) in Ukraine, in Lviv Raion of Lviv Oblast. The administrative center is the village of Zymna Voda.

Until 18 July 2020, the hromada belonged to Pustomyty Raion. The raion was abolished in July 2020 as part of the administrative reform of Ukraine, which reduced the number of raions of Lviv Oblast to seven.

Settlements 
The hromada consists of 5 villages:
Kholodnovidka
Lapaivka
Sknyliv
Sukhovolia
Zymna Voda

References

External links 
 

Lviv Raion
Hromadas of Lviv Oblast
2018 establishments in Ukraine